Hallowell is a city in Kennebec County, Maine, United States. The population was 2,570 at the 2020 census. Popular with tourists, Hallowell is noted for its culture and old architecture. Hallowell is included in the Augusta, Maine, micropolitan New England City and Town Area.

History

The city is named for Benjamin Hallowell, a Boston merchant and one of the Kennebec Proprietors, holders of land originally granted to the Plymouth Company by the British monarchy in the 1620s.

First to settle here was Deacon Pease Clark, who emigrated with his wife and son Peter from Attleborough, Massachusetts, in the spring of 1762. Legend has it that after disembarking on the west side of the Kennebec, near present-day Water Street, the Clarks took shelter in their overturned cart. On a riverfront lot measuring 50 rods (275 yards, about 250 meters), the Clark family raised corn, rye and other crops. The first land they cleared was occupied by the fire department in 1859.

In 1797, Harrington (later the city of Augusta) split from Hallowell to be a separate town. The part of Hallowell that is the current city was then known as "The Hook". Today, the city's population (2,467) is only slightly smaller than it was in 1820, the year Maine seceded from Massachusetts and became a state. Yet 183 years ago, Hallowell's inhabitants enjoyed the services of 71 stores along Water Street (by contrast, Augusta had a population of 1,000 and just 20 merchants). On February 20, 1799, Hallowell was reapportioned from Lincoln County to Kennebec County.

Thriving industries included logging, trading, publishing and shipbuilding. Location on the navigable Kennebec River estuary allowed 50 ships launched from Hallowell's wharves to reach the Atlantic Ocean between 1783 and 1901. Two grist mills, five sawmills and two slaughterhouses served the needs of residents near and far.

In 1815, the first granite quarried near the Manchester town line signaled the birth of an industry that would support Hallowell until 1908, when cement displaced stone as the construction material of choice. In 1826, the ice industry began in earnest, employing thousands over the next 75 years. Frozen blocks loaded onto Hallowell's schooners were delivered to Cuba and the West Indies. Other local products exported via the Kennebec (and, after 1857, by train) from Hallowell included sandpaper, textiles from cotton from the Deep South, rope, linseed oil, oilcloth, wire, books and shoes.

The Kennebec River sustained the city from its inception, but the mighty freeway also inspired fear. Spring floods regularly terrorized shopkeepers and sometimes brought commerce to a standstill. Worse still, citizens eager to cross the river in winter and unwary children skating and playing too far from the riverbank lost their lives when ice turned out to be thinner than it looked. On July 9, 1816, a freak frost during the Year Without a Summer destroyed crops and forced hungry families to sell their farms for half their worth.

In 1874, the state opened the Maine Industrial School for Girls in Hallowell. Operated until the 1970s, it was the state's first reform school for girls.

Geography
Hallowell is located at  (44.286802, −69.797884).

Drained by Vaughn Brook, Hallowell is bounded by the Kennebec River.

The city is crossed by Interstate 95, as well as state routes 27 and 201. It borders the towns of Farmingdale to the south, Manchester to the west, Augusta to the north, and Chelsea across the Kennebec River to the east.

Climate
This climatic region is typified by large seasonal temperature differences, with warm to hot (and often humid) summers and cold (sometimes severely cold) winters.  According to the Köppen Climate Classification system, Hallowell has a humid continental climate, abbreviated "Dfb" on climate maps.

Culture

Hallowell is nicknamed "The Little Easy," or "New Orleans on the Kennebec." The city is also known as "Maine's Antique Riverport."

Since 1968, the community has hosted Old Hallowell Day, an annual celebration hosted on the third weekend of July, that includes a parade, fireworks, and live performances.

The city is the home of Gaslight Theater, one of Maine's oldest community theater companies.

Hallowell has been a regional center for the arts for many years in central Maine, with renowned art galleries, performing arts theaters, studios, festivals, and local artists. Hallowell is also home to renowned bars, taverns and restaurants, with the downtown area having a high concentration of eating and drinking establishments.

The Hallowell Farmers' Market takes place every Tuesday from 4:00 pm until dark on the riverfront.

Demographics

2010 census
As of the census of 2010, there were 2,381 people, 1,193 households, and 556 families living in the city. The racial makeup of the city was 95.5% White, 0.7% African American, 0.5% Native American, 1.5% Asian, 0.1% from other races, and 1.7% from two or more races. Hispanic or Latino of any race were 1.1% of the population.

There were 1,193 households, of which 17.5% had children under the age of 18 living with them, 36.3% were married couples living together, 6.9% had a female householder with no husband present, 3.4% had a male householder with no wife present, and 53.4% were non-families. 45.8% of all households were made up of individuals, and 20.2% had someone living alone who was 65 years of age or older. The average household size was 1.89 and the average family size was 2.63.

The median age in the city was 50.5 years. 14% of residents were under the age of 18; 5.8% were between the ages of 18 and 24; 22.3% were from 25 to 44; 33.4% were from 45 to 64; and 24.5% were 65 years of age or older. The gender makeup of the city was 46.3% male and 53.7% female.

2000 census
As of the census of 2000, there were 2,467 people, 1,145 households, and 604 families living in the city. The racial makeup of the city was 97.20% White, 0.41% African American, 0.32% Native American, 0.89% Asian, 0.04% Pacific Islander, and 1.13% from two or more races. Hispanic or Latino of any race were 1.13% of the population.

There were 1,145 households, out of which 25.2% had children under the age of 18 living with them, 40.7% were married couples living together, 8.6% had a female householder with no husband present, and 47.2% were non-families. 41.5% of all households were made up of individuals, and 12.8% had someone living alone who was 65 years of age or older. The average household size was 2.06 and the average family size was 2.80.

In the city, the population was spread out, with 21.0% under the age of 18, 6.5% from 18 to 24, 28.1% from 25 to 44, 29.1% from 45 to 64, and 15.4% who were 65 years of age or older. The median age was 42 years. For every 100 females, there were 91.4 males. For every 100 females age 18 and over, there were 89.3 males.

The median income for a household in the city was $59,500, and the median income for a family was $73,510. Males had a median income of $47,381 versus $25,139 for females. The per capita income for the city was $41,687. About 5.4% of families and 6.0% of the population were below the poverty line, including 15.6% of those under age 18 and 2.0% of those age 65 or over.

Government

Local government
The City of Hallowell has a mayor and council-manager form of government. The voters of Hallowell elect councilors and a mayor who represent them through the government process.

The mayor appoints and the council ratifies a city manager to be the administrative head of the city. The position of mayor is largely ceremonial. The city manager oversees the daily operations of the city government, prepares annual budgets, and directs all city agencies and departments.

Political makeup
Hallowell is a well known left-leaning city and has the seventh highest percent of Democratic voters of all municipalities in Maine with a population over 1,000. The city voted for Barack Obama by more than a 2-to-1 margin in the 2008 presidential Election, and the 2012 presidential Election. In 2012 the city voted on a statewide referendum to allow same-sex marriage in Maine by a vote of 69% to 31%.

Voter registration

Education

Hallowell, along with Farmingdale, Maine, is served by the Hall-Dale School System, which is part of the Kennebec Intra-District Schools (KIDS) Regional School Unit 2, which joins the towns of Chelsea, Dresden, Farmingdale, Hallowell, Monmouth, and Richmond.

Hallowell and Farmingdale operate 3 schools:

Hall-Dale Elementary School (Pre-K–5) 389 students, Hallowell
Hall-Dale Middle School (6–8) 201 students, Farmingdale
Hall-Dale High School (9–12) 349 students, Farmingdale

Architecture

The former Emporium, at today's 154 Water Street, was built in the early 19th century. Its significance of having a cast-iron facade installed around 1870, altering it to its present Victorian appearance, is demonstrated by its listing in the Historic American Buildings Survey.

Site of interest
 Elm Hill Farm
 Gaslight Theater
 Hallowell Area Board of Trade
 Historic Hallowell Committee
 Harlow Gallery, home of the Kennebec Valley Art Association (founded in 1963)
 Hubbard Free Library
 Kennebec Ice Arena
 Kennebec Lodge No. 5 A.F. & A.M., Masonic lodge chartered in Hallowell by Paul Revere in 1796
 Liberal Cup Microbrewery
 Powder House Lot
 Row House
 St. Matthew's Episcopal Church
 Vaughan Homestead

Notable people

See also
Hallowell Historic District

References

External links

 City of Hallowell, Maine
 Hubbard Free Library
 Kennebec Historical Society
 Hallowell Area Board of Trade and local businesses, Hallowell
 Maine.gov – Hallowell, Maine 
 Old Hallowell Day, annual celebration of all things Hallowellian

 
Populated places established in 1762
Cities in Maine
Cities in Kennebec County, Maine